Nadia Szold (born 28 September 1984) is a film director, producer and writer. She began working in theater in her teens in New England. After reading Waiting for Godot at 17, Nadia Szold formed Cojones Company. Fourteen plays later, she founded Cinema Imperfecta out of her apartment in Red Hook, Brooklyn. Hope & Anchor, Thievery, The Persian Love Cake and Some Kinda Fuckery were the first short films produced and directed under its banner in Paris and New York. Simultaneously, Szold worked for Robin O'Hara and Scott Macaulay of Forensic Films. She also earned a degree from Werner Herzog’s Rogue Film School.

Her first feature film, which she both produced and wrote, Joy de V., premiered at Slamdance in 2013 to critical acclaim and won a Special Jury Mention. The film starred Evan Louison, Josephine de La Baume, Iva Gocheva, and Claudia Cardinale.

Her second feature, Mariah, starring Dakota Goldhor and Evan Luison Louison, was shot in Mexico during the rise of vigilante groups reclaiming cartel controlled regions.

A Film Independent Fellow of the 2016 Documentary Lab, Szold is currently in post-production on the archival documentary Larry Flynt for President.

Filmography
 Thievery (2007)
 The Persian Love Cake (2008)
 Some Kinda Fuckery (2009)
 Joy de V. (2013)
Mariah (2014)
Larry Flynt for President (Current)

References

1984 births
American women film producers
American women screenwriters
Living people
21st-century American women